Applin is a surname. Notable people with the surname include:

 Esther Applin (1895–1972), American geologist and paleontologist
 Reginald Applin (1869–1957), British military officer